Talmadge Loraine Heflin (born January 16, 1940) is an American politician. He served as a Republican member for the 149th district of the Texas House of Representatives.

Born in Webster Parish, Louisiana, he is the son of Lucille Lee and Sam Heflin. Heflin moved to Houston, Texas in 1967, in which he had established his own business. He served as a school board member at Alief Independent School District, which later named an elementary school in his honor.

In 1983, Heflin won election in the 149th district of the Texas House of Representatives.  In 2005, he was succeeded by Hubert Vo.

In 2008, he served as a Texas political elector for John McCain's campaign in his 2008 United States presidential election.

References 

1940 births
Living people
Republican Party members of the Texas House of Representatives
Businesspeople from Louisiana
Businesspeople from Texas
People from Houston
People from Hays County, Texas
School board members in Texas
2008 United States presidential electors
20th-century American politicians
21st-century American politicians